Kunwinjku is a dialect of Bininj Kunwok, an Australian Aboriginal language. The Aboriginal people who speak Kunwinjku are the Bininj people, who live primarily in western Arnhem Land. As Kunwinjku is the most widely spoken dialect of Bininj Kunwok, 'Kunwinjku' is sometimes used to refer to Bininj Kunwok as a whole. Kunwinjku is spoken primarily in the west of the Bininj Kunwok speaking areas, including the town of Gunbalanya, as well as outstations such as Mamardawerre, Kumarrirnbang, Kudjekbinj and Manmoyi.

References

Further reading 
 
 
 , 2 volumes

External links
Bininj Kunwok online dictionary

Kunwok
 

Gunwinyguan languages
Arnhem Land
Indigenous Australian languages in the Northern Territory